Thewakam Rangrak Bridge (usually shortened to "Thewakam Bridge") is a historic bridge of Bangkok located in the border of Wat Sommanat sub-district, Pom Prap Sattru Phai district and Si Yaek Maha Nak with Suan Chitlada sub-districts, Dusit district.

The bridge crossing over Khlong Phadung Krung Kasem (Phadung Krung Kasem canal) at Nakhon Sawan road (named in honour of Prince Paribatra Sukhumbandhu, Prince of Nakhon Sawan). King Chulalongkorn (Rama V) ordered the Department of Public Works to build in 1899, to link Thanon Talat (ถนนตลาด) with Thanon Plai Talat (ถนนปลายตลาด), which is Nakhon Sawan road in the present day. King Chulalongkorn had presided over the bridge's opening ceremony on November 15, 1900. The bridge was later on renovated to be a concrete bridge. And in 1975, it was rebuilt again and enlarged the traffic surface like today condition. This bridge is one of the set of five bridges crossing over Khlong Phadung Krung Kasem, all having the name in the meaning of "Created by Deity". For Thewakam Rangrak meaning "The Bridge Created by Thewakam" [Thewakam  is a deity according to the faith of Thais, similar to Ganesh of Hinduism].

It's located close to the historic marketplace, Talat Nang Loeng and Royal Dusit Golf Club, also considered close to the side of the Government House. So it's another point that is often used as a venue for political demonstrations as well.

See also
Wisukam Narueman Bridge
Makkhawan Rangsan Bridge

References 

Road junctions in Bangkok
Bridges in Bangkok
Dusit district
Pom Prap Sattru Phai district
Bridges completed in 1900